Charlotte Wardlaw (born 20 February 2003) is an English footballer, who plays for Lewes on loan from Chelsea. She has captained the England women's under-15, under-17 and under-19 teams, and represented the under-23 team.

Club career
Wardlaw started playing football at the age of six, for Carshalton Athletic. At the age of 13, she joined the Millwall Lionesses Academy, and aged 15, she joined Chelsea Academy. At the age of 16, Wardlaw made her senior debut for Chelsea in a 2018–19 FA Women's League Cup against Tottenham Hotspur. Chelsea won the match 5–1. She also made appearances in Chelsea's 2019–20 Women's FA Cup match against Charlton Athletic, and their 2020–21 Women's FA Cup match against London City Lionesses.

In June 2021, Wardlaw signed a two-year professional contract with Chelsea. It was her first professional contract. In August 2021, she joined FA Women's Championship club Liverpool on loan for the remainder of the season. She was Liverpool's eighth signing of the season. She scored her first Liverpool goal as they beat Sheffield United 2–0 in October 2021, and also scored in Liverpool's 2021–22 Women's FA Cup fourth round match against Lincoln City. In September 2022, Wardlaw was re-loaned to Liverpool for the 2022–23 season. She returned to Chelsea in January 2023. A few weeks later, she was loaned out again, this time to Women's Championship side, Lewes.

International career
Wardlaw has captained the England women's under-15, under-17 and under-19 teams. In 2017, she was part of the England under-15s team that beat Wales under-15s 7–0. She captained England under-17s in 2020 UEFA Women's Under-17 Championship qualification matches. She was in the England squad for the 2022 UEFA Women's Under-19 Championship. In October 2022, she played for the England under-23 team in a match against Sweden.

References

External links

Chelsea Profile

2003 births
Living people
English women's footballers
Women's Championship (England) players
Carshalton Athletic F.C. players
Millwall Lionesses L.F.C. players
Chelsea F.C. Women players
Liverpool F.C. Women players
Lewes F.C. Women players
Women's association football defenders
England women's youth international footballers